"That's What I Like About the West" is a song written by Edith Bergdahl and Robert McGimsey, performed by the Tex Williams (and His Western Caravan), and released in 1947 on the Capitol Americana label (catalog no. A40031). In October 1947, it peaked at No. 3 on the Billboard folk chart. It was also ranked as the No. 14 record on the Billboard 1947 year-end folk juke box chart.

References

Tex Williams songs
1947 songs